Vardy is a surname. Notable people with the surname include:

 Alexander Vardy (born 1963), Israeli-American Electrical Engineer
 Donna Vardy (born 1971), English squash player
 Jamie Vardy (born 1987), English footballer
 John Vardy (1718–1765), English architect attached to the Royal Office of Works from 1736
 Nathan Vardy (born 1991), Australian rules footballer
 Oliver Vardy (1906–1980), Canadian broadcaster, business executive, civil servant and politician 
 Peter Vardy (disambiguation), multiple people, including:
Peter Vardy (businessman) (born 1947), British businessman and philanthropist from Houghton-le-Spring in Durham
Peter Vardy (footballer) (born 1976), former Australian rules footballer
Peter Vardy (theologian) (born 1945), British academic, philosopher, theologian and author
 Rebekah Vardy (born 1982), English model and I'm a Celebrity contestant
 Royce Vardy (born 1980), Australian rules footballer

See also
Reg Vardy Band, brass band based in North East England
Vardy Community School, Presbyterian mission school in the Vardy community of Hancock County, Tennessee, USA
Vardia
Vardja (disambiguation)
Varudi